Barry James Dean (born February 26, 1955) is a Canadian former professional ice hockey player. Dean was drafted second overall in the 1975 NHL Amateur Draft by the Kansas City Scouts. He played 71 World Hockey Association (WHA) games for the Phoenix Roadrunners, as well as 165 National Hockey League (NHL) games for the Colorado Rockies and the Philadelphia Flyers, and retired in 1982.

Personal life
Barry Dean is the uncle of current NHL player Zack Smith.

Career statistics

Regular season and playoffs

Awards
 WCHL All-Star Team – 1975

References

External links
 

1955 births
Colorado Rockies (NHL) players
Edmonton Oilers (WHA) draft picks
Ice hockey people from Saskatchewan
Kansas City Scouts draft picks
Living people
Medicine Hat Tigers players
National Hockey League first-round draft picks
Philadelphia Flyers players
Phoenix Roadrunners (WHA) players
World Hockey Association first round draft picks
Canadian expatriate ice hockey players in the United States
Canadian ice hockey left wingers